George Hood (August 28, 1794 – June 29, 1859) was a Massachusetts politician who served in both houses of the Massachusetts legislature and as the first Mayor of Lynn, Massachusetts.

Notes

1806 births
Mayors of Lynn, Massachusetts
Democratic Party members of the Massachusetts House of Representatives
Democratic Party Massachusetts state senators
1859 deaths
19th-century American politicians